RK Mornar-Crikvenica (Rukometni Klub Mornar-Crikvenica) is a handball club from Crikvenica, Croatia, formed in 2017 by the merger of RK Crivenica and RK Mornar.

History

RK Mornar (1980–2017)
RK Mornar was founded 26 May 1980 in Dramalj on the initiative of Stjepan Lončarić.

RK Crikvenica (1956–2017)
RK Crikvenica was founded in October 1956 in Crikvenica. The club was founded on the initiative of gymnasium gymnastics teacher Branko Banjanin. During the Yugoslav Handball Championship Crikvenica competed in lower tier leagues. From 1985 the club didn't have a regulated sports facility so they played their home matches in Delnice, Senj and Rijeka until February 2003 when the city finally built them their ground GSD Crikvenica. The first match played in GSD Crikvenica was RK Crikvenica against RK Umag on 15 February 2003.

In 1999 Crikvenica reached the semi-final of the Croatian Handball Cup where they lost to Medveščak Zagreb (29:22). In 2001 due to reorganization of the Croatian handball league RK Crikvenica entered the First league and maintained 7 seasons in the first tier.

RK Crikvenica seasons

Technical staff
  President: Goran Božić
  Vice president: Dražen Manestar
  Head Coach: Valter Matošević 
  Board members: Robert Hrelja, Senko Smoljan, Dario Butković

Notable former players 

 
  Darko Franović
  Alvaro Načinović
  Mladen Prskalo
  Marin Mišković
  Saša Nikšić
  Vladimir Matejčić
  Igor Dokmanović
  Janko Mavrović
  Bojan Pezelj
  Andrej Sekulić
  Igor Saršon
  Davor Šunjić
  Mirjan Horvat
  Egon Paljar
| valign=top |
  Mateo Hrvatin
  Robert Savković
  Marko Erstić
  Igor Pejić
  Pave Župan
  Mario Broz
  Igor Montanari – Knez
  Jadranko Stoajnović
  Paulo Grozdek
  Moreno Car

Notable former coaches 

  Drago Žiljak (1997–2007)
  Ivan Munitić (2008–2011)

Honours

League
Primorje-Gorski Kotar County league (1): 1978–79
Primorje-Istria league (1): 1984–95
Second League (West) (1): 2017–18

Cup
Croatian Cup Fourth place (1): 1999

Sources
Petar Orgulić – 50 godina rukometa u Rijeci (2004), Adriapublic

References

External links
hrs.hr
hr-rukomet.hr
sportcom.hr
crikva.hr

 
Croatian handball clubs
Handball clubs established in 1956
Handball clubs established in 1980
Handball clubs established in 2017
Sport in Primorje-Gorski Kotar County
1956 establishments in Croatia